The United Nations geoscheme is a system which divides 249 countries and territories in the world into six regional, 17 subregional, and nine intermediate regional groups. It was devised by the United Nations Statistics Division (UNSD) based on the M49 coding classification. The creators note that "the assignment of countries or areas to specific groupings is for statistical convenience and does not imply any assumption regarding political or other affiliation of countries or territories".

Usage 
The schema was created for statistical analysis and consists of macro-geographical regions arranged to the extent possible according to continents. Within each region, smaller geographical sub-regions and sometimes intermediate regions contain countries. Countries are also grouped nongeographically into selected economic and other sets.

Antarctica is the only geographical region which does not comprise any sub-regions or country-level areas.

The UNSD geoscheme does not set a standard for the entire United Nations System, and it often differs from geographical definitions used by the autonomous United Nations specialized agencies for their own organizational convenience. For instance, the UNSD includes Cyprus and Georgia in Western Asia, yet the United Nations Industrial Development Organization and UNESCO include them in Europe. This "statistical" definition also differs from United Nations Regional Groups

Alternative groupings 
Other alternative groupings include the World Bank regional classification, CIA World Factbook regions and Internet Corporation for Assigned Names and Numbers Geographic Regions.

Africa 

 Northern Africa
 Sub-Saharan Africa
 Eastern Africa
 Middle Africa
 Southern Africa
 Western Africa

Americas 

 Latin America and the Caribbean
 Caribbean†
 Central America†
 South America
 Northern America†

† The Caribbean, Central America, and Northern America together form the geographical continent of North America.

Asia 

 Central Asia
 Eastern Asia
 South-eastern Asia
 Southern Asia
 Western Asia

Europe 

 Eastern Europe (including Northern Asia)
 Northern Europe
 Channel Islands
 Southern Europe
 Western Europe

Oceania 

 Australia and New Zealand
 Melanesia
 Micronesia
 Polynesia

Maps

See also 
 List of countries by United Nations geoscheme
 Regions of Europe
 United Nations Regional Groups
 United Nations Statistics Division

References 

 
geoscheme